Muktinath is a Vishnu temple, sacred to both Hindus and Buddhists. It is located in Muktinath Valley at the foot of the Thorong La mountain pass in Mustang, Nepal. It is one of the world's highest temples (altitude 3,800 m). Within Hinduism, it is one of the 108 Divya Desams, and is the only Divya Desam located outside India. It known as Mukti Kshetra, which literally means the 'liberation arena' (moksha) and is one of the Char Dham in Nepal.

This temple is considered to be 106th of the 108 Divya Desam considered sacred by the Sri Vaishnava sect. Its ancient name in Sri Vaishnava literature is Tiru Shaligramam. The Gandaki river, which flows nearby, is considered to be the only source of the shaligrama shila, the non-anthropomorphic representation of Vishnu.

Buddhists call it Chumig Gyatsa, which in Tibetan means "Hundred Waters". For Tibetan Buddhists, Muktinath is an important place of dakinis, goddesses known as Sky Dancers, and one of the 24 Tantric places. They understand the murti to be a manifestation of Avalokiteśvara, who embodies the compassion of all Buddhas.

The site is close to the village of Ranipauwa, which is sometimes mistakenly called Muktinath.

Legend

The Tibetan Buddhist tradition states that Guru Rinpoche, also known as Padmasambhava, the founder of Tibetan Buddhism, meditated at Muktinath on his way to Tibet. This temple is praised by many saints of the Hindu tradition. Scripts narrating the temple's importance are available in Vishnu Purana with the Gandaki Mahatmya.

The waterway downstream from Muktinath along Kali Gandaki is the source of the shilas or shaligramas that are required to establish a temple of Vishnu. It is considered to be one of the holiest places of pilgrimage for Hindus and Buddhists.

It has 108 water springs, a number that carries great significance in Hindu philosophy. As an example of the mystery surrounding the number 108, Hindu astrology mentions 12 zodiacs (rashi) and nine planets (navagraha), giving a total of 108 combinations. The 27 lunar mansions (nakshatras) are divided into four quarters (or padas) each giving a combination of 108 padas in total.

Architecture
The central shrine of Sri Muktinath is considered by Hindu Vaishnavas to be one of the eight most-sacred shrines, known as Svayam Vyakta Ksetras. The others are Srirangam, Srimushnam, Tirupati, Naimisharanya, Thotadri, Pushkar, and Badrinath. The temple is small. The murti is made of gold and is the size of a man.

The prakaram (outer courtyard) has 108 bull faces through which water is poured. The sacred water that flows in 108 pipes around the temple complex denotes the sacred Pushkarini waters (temple tanks) from the 108 Sri Vaishnava Divya Desams, where devotees take their sacred bath even in freezing temperatures.

Religious significance

Hinduism

Sri Vaishnavism 
Muktinath is sacred to the Sri Vaishnava tradition. The deities of Vishnu and his consorts, Sridevi and Bhudevi, are regarded by adherents to offer jivanmukti to devotees, offering the epithet Muktinath to Vishnu. It is praised by Thirumangai Alvar in the compilation of the Nalayira Divya Prabandham. The river Gandaki, flowing adjacent to the temple has a kind of stone called shaligrama. The different patterns of the stone are worshiped as different forms of Vishnu. The colour white is considered Vasudeva, black as Vishnu, green as Narayana, blue as Krishna, golden yellow & reddish yellow as Narasimha and Vamana in yellow. The stones are found in various shapes with even shapes of the Panchajanya and the Sudarshana Chakra, the attributes of Vishnu.The temple is revered in Nalayira Divya Prabandham, the 7th–9th century Vaishnava canon, by Kulasekhara Alvar in one hymn. The temple is classified as a Divya Desam, one of the 108 Vishnu temples that are mentioned in the book. Many devotees have contributed to it, most prominently the Alvars. Thirumangai Alvar could not reach Muktinath, but sang 10 pasurams from the nearest place, in praise of the deity. Periyalvar sang in praise of Vishnu as "Salagramamudaiya Nambi".

The pontiff of Srivilliputtur installed the idols of Andal (Gotadevi), Ramanuja, and Manavala Mamunigal there during the yagna performed between 3 and 6 August 2009. This is considered by devotees of the tradition to be a milestone in the history of Muktinath. A large crowd of devotees visit this shrine, where the deity resides in the form of Sri Paramapada Nathan with his divine consorts of Sridevi, Bhudevi, Niladevi, and Gotadevi.

Shakti Pitha 

The Muktinath Temple is considered to be a Shakti Pitha for a yatra. It is one of the 108 Siddhpeeth and is named Mahadevi [Devibhagwat 7.14]. Shakti Pithas are sacred abodes of Shakti (primordial cosmic energy), formed by the falling body parts of the corpse of Sati, when Shiva carried it as he wandered. 51 Shakti Pithas are revered by Shaktism, connecting them to the 51 alphabets in Sanskrit. Each Shakti Pitha has a Shakti shrine and a Bhairav shrine in its temple. The Shakti of Muktinath is addressed as "Gandaki Chandi", and the Bhairava as "Chakrapani". Sati's temple on the forehead is believed to have fallen there.

Sri Murti Mahatmyam 

Hindu and Buddhist traditions claim this site to be the only place on earth to host all five elements (fire, water, sky, earth and air) from which all material things in the universe are made. Along with the ambient earth, air, and sky, there is a water spring co-located with a flame fueled by naturally occurring gas outflow -- giving the appearance of the water itself burning.

Buddhism 
Worship is conducted by Buddhists, with a Buddhist monk present. A local nun manages the pujas (prayer rituals) in the temple. Pilgrims are expected to offer a prasad (religious offering of food) to the deity.

Tourism 
Muktinath, being one of the world's most famous religious and tourism locations, receives thousands of visitors every year. According to the data provided by the Jomsom-based information centre of the Annapurna Conservation Area Project (ACAP), 9,105 foreigners visited Muktinath in April 2018 alone, among which Indian tourists were counted at 4,537. ACAP's data show that the number of Indian tourists visiting Muktinath temple has been increasing every year. International tourists visit Muktinath mainly en route to the Annapurna Circuit Trek. The route to Muktinath is also popular among the biking community throughout the year.

Gallery

See also
 Narsingh Gompa, a buddhist monastery nearby
 Bajrayogini Temple
 Guhyeshwari Temple
 Pashupatinath temple, Nepal
 Badrinath
 Kedarnath
 Manasarovar
 Changu Narayan
 Janaki Mandir
 Shree Pashupatinath
 Budhanilkantha Temple, Sleeping Vishnu

References

Picture in map of nepal

 
Hindu pilgrimage sites in Nepal
Hindu temples in Gandaki Province
Char Dham temples in Nepal
Vishnu temples in Nepal